Bargstedt is a municipality in the district of Rendsburg-Eckernförde, in Schleswig-Holstein, Germany.

The location of Bargstedt is south of the municipality of Brammer, but north of Heinkenborstel or Gnutz, and east of Luhnstedt.

References

Municipalities in Schleswig-Holstein
Rendsburg-Eckernförde